The National Coordination for Disaster Reduction (CONRED) is a Guatemalan government organization created to prevent disasters or reduce their impact on society, and coordinate disaster relief efforts.
 Day-to-day management is carried out by the Executive Secretary of CONRED, also known as SE-CONRED. The current Executive Secretary of CONRED is Oscar Estuardo Cossío Cámara, a former Vice Minister of Defense and former general of the Guatemalan Army.

CONRED is responsible for assessing potential hazards, impending or actual disasters based on information provided by the National Institute for Seismology, Vulcanology, Meteorology and Hydrology (INSIVUMEH), and for declaring states of alert. Once a disaster has been declared, it is responsible for the coordination of cross-sectoral disaster relief efforts.

CONRED is part of a Central American network of governmental disaster relief agencies known as the Coordination Center for the Prevention of Natural Disasters in Central America ( (CEPREDENAC)). CEPREDENAC was created in the context of the Central American Integration System.

History 
CONRED was officially established in 1996 by the Guatemalan congress in Decree No. 109-96, Law on the National Coordinator for the Reduction of Natural or Manmade Disasters. The organization was intended as a civilian successor to CONE, the military-led National Committee on Emergency.

List of Executive Secretaries

References

External links
Coordination Center for the Prevention of Natural Disasters in Central America (CEPREDENAC)
SATCA Early warning system for Central America (Sistema de Alerta Temprana para Centroamérica (SATCA))
Humanitarian Information Network for Latin America and the Caribbean (Red de Información Humanitaria  para América Latina y el Caribe (Redhum))

Government of Guatemala
Emergency management in Guatemala